Murder at Teesri Manzil 302 is a 2021 Indian Hindi-language murder mystery film directed by Navneet Baj Saini, starring Irrfan Khan, Ranvir Shorey, Deepal Shaw and Lucky Ali. The film was stuck in development hell after its completion in the year 2009. Termed as one among Khan's unreleased films, finally premiered  on ZEE5 on 31 December 2021, but with poor reviews. It marks a posthumous appearance for Khan following his death on 29 April 2020.

Plot
A wealthy businessman's wife mysteriously disappears, and a team of investigating officers embark on a search for her. Will they be able to decipher what's going on?

Cast 
Irrfan Khan as Shekhar Sharma (Sheky)
Ranvir Shorey as Abhishek Deewan
Deepal Shaw as Maya Deewan
Lucky Ali
Nausheen Ali Sardar

Production
The film was in production from 2008, finally was completed in 2009 but was in the cans for years until it was premiered through ZEE5. The film, thus became the posthumous official release of actor Irrfan Khan who died on 29 April 2020, at the age of 53 years old, due to neuroendocrine cancer.

References

External links
 

2021 films
2020s Hindi-language films
Hindi-language thriller films
Indian thriller films
Indian direct-to-video films
ZEE5 original films